David Burgess-Wise is a motoring author, enthusiast, and automobile historian. 

According to the dustcover of the book "The Illustrated Encyclopedia of Automobiles" he edited in 1979, David Burgess Wise [with no "-"] was born in 1942.

A motoring writer since 1960, Burgess-Wise has written 25 books on motoring history. He also edits the award-winning Aston, journal of the Aston Martin Heritage Trust.

See also
Electric Motive Power

References

External links

Living people
British motoring journalists
Automotive historians
Year of birth missing (living people)
20th-century British male writers
20th-century British non-fiction writers
21st-century British male writers
21st-century British non-fiction writers